This is a timeline of Portuguese São Tomé and Príncipe from its discovery between mid-January 1469 to 1471 to independence on July 12, 1975.  It includes the time when the island was under Dutch and French occupations and the separate colonies of São Tomé and Príncipe up to its unification in 1753.

15th century
Between mid-January 1469 and 1471 - The first islands of São Tomé and Santo Antão (now Príncipe) were discovered by the explorers João de Santarém and Pêro Escobar
1493:
The first successful settlement of São Tomé was established by Álvaro Caminha
Torre do Capitão (Captain's Tower) built

16th century
1502 - The first successful settlement of Príncipe was established with a similar arrangement to São Tomé, it was named Santo António, it adopted the current island name
1515 - São Tomé and Príncipe had become slave depots for the coastal slave trade centered at Elmina Castle in modern-day Ghana
1520 - May 14: A total solar eclipse took place 75–80 miles (120–130 km) south of the island of São Tome, it was partial in the islands as the sky was almost dark
1522:
São Tomé and Príncipe were taken over and administered by the Portuguese crown
Vasco Estevens became captain of  the island of São Tomé
1528 - May 18: A hybrid solar eclipse took place just south of the island of São Tome in the mid-morning hours, it was as an annular in the islands as the sky was almost dark
1531 - Henrique Pereira became captain of the island of São Tomé
1534 - The city of São Tomé became a bishopric through the Bull "Aequum reputamus" of Pope Paul IV, the diocese of Tomé (now São Tomé and Príncipe) was established, also the Our Lady of Grace church became a cathedral
1540 or 1550 - A ship carrying slaves from Angola to Brazil shipwrecked in the south of São Tomé
1541 - Diogo Botelho Pereira became captain of the island of São Tomé
1546 - Francisco de Barros de Paiva became captain of the island of São Tomé
c. 1558 - Pedro Botelho became captain of the island of São Tomé
1560 - Cristóvão Dória de Sousa became captain of the island of São Tomé
1564 - Francisco de Gouveia became captain of the island of São Tomé
1566 - Fortim de São Jerónimo built on the island of São Tomé
1569 - Francisco de Paiva Teles became captain of the island of São Tomé
1571 - Diogo Salema became captain of the island of São Tomé
1573 - São Tomé and Príncipe were taken over and administered by the Portuguese crown for the second time
1575:
Fort São Sebastião near the town of São Tomé built
António Monteiro Maciel became captain of the island of São Tomé
1576-1578 - Our Lady of Grace Cathedral made renovation works
c. 1584 - Francisco Fernandes de Figueiredo became captain of the island of São Tomé
1585 - The Habsburg Philippine Dynasty in power
1586 - Francisco Fernandes de FIgueiredo became the first governor of the island of São Tomé
1587 - Miguel Teles de Moura became the second governor of the island of São Tomé
1591 - Duarte Peixoto da Silva became the third governor of the island of São Tomé
1592 - Francisco de Vila Nova becomes acting governor of the island of São Tomé
1593 - Fernandes de Meneses becomes the fourth governor of the island of São Tomé
1595 - 9 July: Rei Amador and most of the slaves took part in the Angolar revolt, they marched into the capital and were subjugated a year later
1596 - 4 January: Rei Amador captured and later imprisoned and executed for his slave rebellion
1597 - Vasco de Carvalho becomes the fifth governor of the island of São Tomé
1598
August - First Dutch occupation of the island
October - First Dutch occupation ends, archipelago returned to Portuguese rule
João Barbosa da Cunha became acting governor of the island of São Tomé for Vasco de Carvalho
1599 - The island of São Tomé taken by Laurens Bicker and his troops and was briefly ruled by the Dutch

17th century
1601:
António Maciel Monteiro became acting governor of the island of São Tomé Island for Vasco de Carvalho
Vasco de Carvalho de Sousa was 1st governor of the island of Príncipe
Jan 4: An annular solar eclipse took place southeast of the island of São Tome, it was as partial in the islands as the sky was almost dark
1604 - Rui de Sousa de Alarcão was 2nd governor of the island of Príncipe
1609 :
D. Fernando de Noronha was the last governor of the islands of São Tomé and Príncipe
João Barbosa da Cunha no longer acting governor of the island of São Tomé
Constantino Tavares was the 8th governor of the island of São Tomé
1611:
João Barbosa da Cunha was again acting governor of the island of São Tomé, this time for Constantino Tavares
Francisco Teles de Mendes was the 9th governor of the island of São Tomé
Luís Dias de Abreu was the 10th governor of the island of São Tomé
1613 - Feliciano Carvalho was the 11th governor of the island of São Tomé
1614 - Luís Dias de Abreu was the 12th governor of the island of São Tomé and served his second term
1616 - Miguel Correia Baharem was the 13th governor of the island of São Tomé
1619 - July 11: A total solar eclipse took place in the north of the island of São Tome and all of Príncipe, the path were inside and the sky was dark, it was as partial in the south and the sky was almost dark
1620 - Pedro da Cunha was the 14th governor of the island of São Tomé
1621 - Félix Pereira was the 15th governor of the island of São Tomé
1623 - Jerónimo de Melo Fernando was the 16th governor of the island of São Tomé
1627 - André Gonçalves Maracote was the 17th governor of the island of São Tomé
1628 - Lourenço Pires de Távora was the acting governor of the island of São Tomé for André Gonçalves Maracote
1632:
Francisco Barreto de Meneses was the 18th governor of the island of São Tomé
Lourenço Pires de Távora was again the acting governor of the island of São Tomé, this time for Francisco Barreto de Meneses
1636:
António de Carvalho was the 19th governor of the island of São Tomé
Lourenço Pires de Távora was again the acting governor of the island of São Tomé, this time for António de Carvalho
1640 :
Manuel Quaresma Carneiro became the 20th governor of the island of São Tomé
Miguel Pereira de Melo e Albuquerque became the acting governor of the island of São Tomé for Manuel Quaresma Carneiro
1641:
October 3: Start of the Dutch occupation of the archipelago led by Cornelius Jol
Paulo da Ponte became acting governor of the island of São Tomé for Manuel Quaresma Carneiro
October 31: Cornelis Jol died of malaria
1642 - Lourenço Pires de Távora became the 21st governor of the island of São Tomé up to 1650
1648 - the Dutch were expelled from the archipelago, continuation of Portuguese rule
1656 - Cristovão de Barros do Rěgo became governor of the island of São Tomé to the mid 1660s
1661 - Pedro da Silva became governor of the island of São Tomé
1663 - the Dutch captured a part of the island and Admiral de Ruyter and built a small fort (now Forte Pequeno), the Dutch were later kicked out by the Portuguese
1669 - Paulo Ferreira de Noronha became governor of the island of São Tomé
1671 - Chamber Senate begins in the island of São Tomé
1673 - Chamber Senate ends and Julião dos Campos Barreto became governor of the island of São Tomé
1676 - December 5: A total solar eclipse took place only in and within the island of São Tome during mid-morning, the island and its surroundings were inside the path and the sky was dark
1677 - Bernardim Freire de Andrade became acting governor of the island of São Tomé for Julião dos Campos Barreto
1680 - Jacinto de Figueiredo e Abreu became governor of the island of São Tomé
1683 - João Álvares da Cunha became acting governor for Jacinto de Figueredo e Abreu
1686:
António Pereira de Brito Lemos became governor of the island of São Tomé
Later in the year, Bento de Sousa Lima became governor of the island of São Tomé
1689 - António Pereira de Lacerda became governor of the island of São Tomé
1693 - António de Barredo became governor of the island of São Tomé
1695:
José Pereira Sodré became governor of the island of São Tomé
Príncipe's fortress, the Fortaleza de Santo António da Ponta da Mina built northeast of Santo Antònio
1696 - João da Costa Matos became governor of the island of São Tomé
1697 - Manuel António Pinheiro da Câmara became governor of the island of São Tomé

18th century
1702 - José Correia de Castro became governor of the island of São Tomé
1709:
Vicente Dinis Pinheiro became governor of the island of São Tomé
Príncipe invaded by the French as part of the wider War of the Spanish Succession, later all of the archipelago was under French rule and a junta was established
1715 - End of French rule in the archipelago, Portuguese rule restored
Bartolomeu da Costa Ponte became governor of the island of São Tomé
1716 - October 15: An annular solar eclipse took place 60–75 miles (100–120 km) southwest of the island of São Tome, it was partial in the islands as the sky was almost dark even inside its path
1719 - The city of Santo António and its fortress was attacked and destroyed by the English pirate Bartholomew Roberts, nicknamed "John Roberts" and "Black Bart" in revenge of the death of his captain Howell Davis.
1720 - Start of the Portuguese junta in São Tomé
1722 - End of the Portuguese junta in the island of São Tomé, José Pinheiro da Câmara became governor
1727 - Serafin Teixeira Sarmento became governor of the island of São Tomé
1734 - Lopo de Sousa Coutinho became governor of the island of São Tomé
1736 - José Caetano Soto Maior became governor of the island of São Tomé
1741:
António Ferrão de Castelo Branco became governor of the island of São Tomé
Later in the year, another Chamber Senate occurred on the island of São Tomé
1744:
Francisco Luís da Conceição became acting governor of the island of São Tomé for Francisco Luís de Conceição
Later in the year, Francisco de Alva Brandão became governor of the island of São Tomé
1747 - Francisco Luís das Chagas became governor of the island of São Tomé
1748 - Another Chamber Senate occurred on the island of São Tomé
1749 - July 14: A total solar eclipse took place between 65–70 miles (105–120 km) southwest of the island of São Tome, it was as partial in the islands as the sky was almost dark
1751:
António Rodriques Neves became the last governor of the island of São Tomé
Another Chamber Senate occurred in the island of São Tomé
1753
The crown colony became united as São Tomé and Príncipe
The colonial capital moved to Santo António on the island of Príncipe
The Chamber Senate occurred in the archipelago
1755:
Lopo de Sousa Coutinho became the 1st governor of Portuguese São Tomé and Príncipe
The 2nd Chamber Senate occurred in the archipelago
1757 - The diocese seat moved to Santo António on the island of Príncipe
1758 - Luís Henrique da Mota e Mele became the 2nd governor of Portuguese São Tomé and Príncipe
1761 - The 3rd Chamber Senate occurred in the archipelago
1767 - Lourenço Lôbo de Almeida Palha became the 3rd governor of Portuguese São Tomé and Príncipe
1768 - The 4th Chamber Senate occurred in the archipelago
1770 - Vicente Gomes Ferreira became the 4th governor of Portuguese São Tomé and Príncipe
1778 - João Manuel de Azambuja became the 5th governor of Portuguese São Tomé and Príncipe
1782 - Cristóvão Xavier de Sá became the 6th governor of Portuguese São Tomé and Príncipe
1784 - The front part of Our Lady of Grace Cathedral in São Tomé was in ruins
1785 - February 9: A total solar eclipse took place with the umbral shadow 30–40 miles (50–60 km) southeast of the island of São Tome, it was as partial in the islands as the sky was almost dark
1788 - João Resende Tavares Leote became the 7th governor of Portuguese São Tomé and Príncipe
1797:
Inácio Francisco de Nóbrega Sousa Coutinho became the 8th governor of Portuguese São Tomé and Príncipe
Later, Manuel Monteiro de Carvalho became acting governor of Portuguese São Tomé and Príncipe for Inácio Francisco de Nóbrega Sousa Coutinho
Varela Borca became the 9th governor of Portuguese São Tomé and Príncipe
1798 - Manuel Francisco Jiaquim da Mota became the 10th governor of Portuguese São Tomé and Príncipe
1799:
Francisco Rafael de Castelo de Vide became the 11th governor of Portuguese São Tomé and Príncipe
Later, João Baptista de Silva became the 12th governor of Portuguese São Tomé and Príncipe

19th century
1802 - Gabriel António Franco de Castro became the 13th governor of Portuguese São Tomé and Príncipe
1805 - Luís Joaquim Lisboa became the 14th governor of Portuguese São Tomé and Príncipe
1814:
January 21: A total solar eclipse took place in the islands of the São Tome and Príncipe, as it was inside the umbral path, the sky was almost dark
Our Lady of Grace Cathedral was restored again at the initiative of the local population
1817 - Filipe de Freitas became the 15th governor of Portuguese São Tomé and Príncipe
1824 - João Maria Xavier de Brito became the 16th governor of Portuguese São Tomé and Príncipe
1825 - Last of the copper coins were minted for the Santomean real for Portuguese São Tomé and Príncipe
1828 - 14 April: A hybrid solar eclipse took place in the islands of the São Tome and Príncipe, the umbral path included the north of São Tomé Island and was shown as an annular and the sky was almost dark
1830 - Joaquim Bento da Fonseca became the 17th governor of Portuguese São Tomé and Príncipe
1834 - A provisional government occurred in Portuguese São Tomé and Príncipe along with the Portuguese Empire as a result of the Portuguese Wars of Liberation
1835 - 20 November: A total solar eclipse took place in the islands of the São Tome and Príncipe, the umbral path included the São Tomé Island and its surroundings and the sky was dark
1836 - Fernando Correia Henriques de Noronha became acting governor of Portuguese São Tomé and Príncipe for Joaquim Bento da Fonseca
1837 - Leandro José da Costa became the 18th governor of Portuguese São Tomé and Príncipe
1838 - José Joaquim de Urbanski became the 19th governor of Portuguese São Tomé and Príncipe
1839 - Bernado José de Sousa Soares de Andréa became the 20th governor of Portuguese São Tomé and Príncipe
1842 - 22 January: The Diocese exclusively included São Tomé and Príncipe, it was not called under the name but Tomé
1843:
5 February - Leandro José da Costa became the 21st governor of Portuguese São Tomé and Príncipeand served his second term
2 March - José Maria Marquěs became the 22nd governor of Portuguese São Tomé and Príncipe
1846 - 1 May: The 3rd Chamber Senate took place
1847:
30 September - Carlos Augusto de Morais e Almeida became the 23rd governor of Portuguese São Tomé and Príncipe
20 November - The 4th Chamber Senate took place
1848
Benga king Bonkoro II from the island of Corisco (today, a part of Equatorial Guinea) moved to the island after rivalries with Munga I who succeeded him
20 July: José Caetano René Vimont Pessoa became the 24th governor of Portuguese São Tomé and Príncipe
1849 - 12 December: Leandro José da Costa became the 25th governor of Portuguese São Tomé and Príncipe and served his third term
1851 - 9 March: José Maria Marquěs became the 26th governor of Portuguese São Tomé and Príncipe and served his second term
1852 - The town of São Tomé (now city) was again colonial capital
1853 - 20 March: Francisco José da Pina Rolo became the 27th governor of Portuguese São Tomé and Príncipe
1855 - 28 July: Adriano Maria Passaláqua became the 28th governor of Portuguese São Tomé and Príncipe
1857 - 21 March: The 5th Chamber Senate took place
1858:
15 January: Francisco António Correia became the 29th governor of Portuguese São Tomé and Príncipe
29 May: The 6th Chamber Senate took place
1859 - Luís José Pereira e Horta became the 30th governor of Portuguese São Tomé and Príncipe
1860 - 21 November: José Pedro de Melo became the 31st governor of Portuguese São Tomé and Príncipe
1862:
8 July: The 7th Chamber Senate took place
17 November - José Eduardo da Costa Moura became the 32nd governor of Portuguese São Tomé and Príncipe
1863 - 30 March: João Baptista Brunachy became the 33rd governor of Portuguese São Tomé and Príncipe
1864 - 8 January: Estanislau Xavier de Assunção e Almeida became the 34th governor of Portuguese São Tomé and Príncipe
1865:
John Gerrard Keulemans was the first Dutch ornithologists who visited Príncipe in 1865, he made observations of the bird species including grey parrot Psittacus erythracus
2 August João Baptista Brunachy became the 35th governor of Portuguese São Tomé and Príncipe and served his second term
1867:
30 July: António Joaquim da Fonseca became the 36th governor of Portuguese São Tomé and Príncipe
30 September: Estanislau Xavier de Assunção e Almeida became the 37th governor of Portuguese São Tomé and Príncipe and served his second term
1868 - Banco Nacional Ultramarino opened its branch in the island of São Tomé, it existed until 1975
1869 - 30 May: Pedro Carlos de Aguiar Craveiro Lopes became the 38th governor of Portuguese São Tomé and Príncipe
1872 - 7 October: João Clímaco de Carvalho became the 39th governor of Portuguese São Tomé and Príncipe
1873 - 28 October: Gregório José Ribeiro became the 40th governor of Portuguese São Tomé and Príncipe
1876:
Portugal officially abolished slavery in 1876 and it included São Tomé and Príncipe
1 November: Estanislau Xavier de Assunção e Almeida became the 41st governor of Portuguese São Tomé and Príncipe and served his third term
1879:
28 September - Francisco Joaquim Ferreira do Amaral became the 42nd governor of Portuguese São Tomé and Príncipe
28 November: Custódio Miguel de Borga became acting governor of Portuguese São Tomé and Príncipe for Francisco Joaquim Ferreira do Amaral
1880 - 3 January: Vicente Pinheiro Lôbo became the 43rd governor of Portuguese São Tomé and Príncipe 
1881 - 30 December: Augusto Maria Leão became acting governor of Portuguese São Tomé and Príncipe for Vicente Pinheiro Lôbo
1882 - 26 January: Francisco Teixeira da Silva became the 44th governor of Portuguese São Tomé and Príncipe
1884 - 24 May: Custódio Miguel de Borga became the 45th governor of Portuguese São Tomé and Príncipe
1885 - The early São Sebastião Lighthouse in the island of São Tomé built
1886 - 25 August: Augusto Céar Rodrigues Sarmento became the 46th governor of Portuguese São Tomé and Príncipe
1890:
Ilhéu das Cabras lighthouse built north of the island of São Tomé
9 March: Firmino José da Costa became the 47th governor of Portuguese São Tomé and Príncipe
1891 - 26 June: Francisco Eugénio Pereira de Miranda became acting governor of Portuguese São Tomé and Príncipe for Firmino José da Costa
1894 - 8 December: Jaime Lobo Brito Godins became the 48th governor of Portuguese São Tomé and Príncipe
1895 - 8 April: Cipriano Leite Pereira Jardim became the 49th governor of Portuguese São Tomé and Príncipe
1897:
Banknotes were issued for Portuguese São Tomé and Príncipe
5 April: Joaquim da Graça Correia e Lança became the 50th governor of Portuguese São Tomé and Príncipe
1899 - 5 April: Amâncio de Alpoim Cerqueira Borges Cabral became the 52nd governor of Portuguese São Tomé and Príncipe

20th century
1901:
3 January: Francisco Maria Peixoto Vieira became acting governor of Portuguese São Tomé and Príncipe for Amâncio de Alpoim Cerqueira Borges Cabral
8 May: Joaquim Xavier de Brito became the 53rd governor of Portuguese São Tomé and Príncipe
1902 - 8 October: João Abel Antunes Mesquita Guimarães became the 54th governor of São Tomé and Príncipe
1903:
7 June: João Gregório Duarte Ferreira became acting governor of Portuguese São Tomé and Príncipe for João Abel Antunes Mesquita Guimarães
14 December: Francisco de Paula Cid became the 55th governor of Portuguese São Tomé and Príncipe
1907:
13 April: Vítor Augusto Chaves Lemos e Melo was acting governor of Portuguese São Tomé and Príncipe for Francisco de Paula Cid
24 June: Pedro Berquó became the 56th governor of Portuguese São Tomé and Príncipe
1908:
São Tomé had become the world's largest producer of cocoa for a few decades
24 October: Vítor Augusto Chaves Lemos e Melo was again acting governor of Portuguese São Tomé and Príncipe, this time for Pedro Berquó
1909:
50,000 réis notes were added by the BNU
13 March: José Augusto Vieira da Fonseca became the 57th governor of Portuguese São Tomé and Príncipe
1910:
The Chief Expedition of the German Central African Expedition stopped by the island at Sāo Tomé then left for the Congo
The German Central African Expedition led by Schultze and Midbraed stopped by the island at São Tomé, the left for Annobón and the Congo
13 June: Jaime Daniel Leote de Rego became the 58th governor of Portuguese São Tomé and Príncipe
7 August: Fernando Augusto de Carvalho became the 59th governor of Portuguese São Tomé and Príncipe
12 November: Carlos de Mendonça Pimentel became acting governor of Portuguese São Tomé and Príncipe for Fernando Augusto de Carvalho
28 November: António Pinto Miranda Guedes became the 60th governor of Portuguese São Tomé and Príncipe
1911:
14 June: Jaime Daniel Leote do Rego became the 61st governor of Portuguese São Tomé and Príncipe and served his second term
24 December: Mariano Martins became the 62nd governor of Portuguese São Tomé and Príncipe
1913 - 13 May: Pedro do Amaral Boto Machado became the 63rd governor of Portuguese São Tomé and Príncipe
1914 - Its own real (as with the rest of the Portuguese Empire) was replaced with the São Tomé and Príncipe escudo
1915:
Aviator Gago Coutinho, officer of the Portuguese Navy, navigator and historian, began his geodesic mission to São Tomé
6 February: Sporting Clube do Príncipe football (soccer) club established
31 May: José Dionísio Carneiro de Sousa e Faro became the 64th governor of Portuguese São Tomé and Príncipe
6 June: Rafael dos Santos Oliveira became acting governor of Portuguese São Tomé and Príncipe for José Dionísio Carneiro de Sousa e Faro
1918:
Aviator Gago Coutinho ended his geodesic mission to São Tomé
28 July: João Gregório Duarte Ferreira became the 65th governor of Portuguese São Tomé and Príncipe
1919:
Gago Coutinho proved that Ilhéu das Rolas is crossed by the equatorial line. The resulting map was published in 1919, together with the Report of the Geodetic Mission on São Tomé Island 1915–1918, that was officially considered the first complete work of practical geodesy in the Portuguese colonies.
May 29: A total solar eclipse took place with its umbral portion the island of Príncipe, there it was the site where Einstein's Theory of Relativity was experimentally corroborated by Arthur Stanley Eddington and his team, the remainder was visible as partial
June 11: Avelino Augusto de Oliveira Leite became the 66th governor of Portuguese São Tomé and Príncipe
1920:
25 September: José Augusto de Conceição Alves Veléz became acting governor of Portuguese São Tomé and Príncipe for Avelino Augusto de Oliveira Leite
22 October: Eduardo Nogueira de Lemos became acting governor of Portuguese São Tomé and Príncipe for Avelino Augusto de Oliveira Leite
1921 - 2 July: António José Pereira became the 67th governor of Portuguese São Tomé and Príncipe
1924:
The Diocese of Tomé was renamed to the Diocese of São Tomé
23 January: Eugénio de Barros Soares Branco became the 68th governor of Portuguese São Tomé and Príncipe
1926 - 8 July: José Duarte Junqueira Rato became the 69th governor of Portuguese São Tomé and Príncipe
1928:
São Sebastião Lighthouse built in São Tomé at the fort
31 August  - Sebastião José Barbosa became acting governor of Portuguese São Tomé and Príncipe for José Duarte Junqueira Rato
1929:
Ilhéu das Rolas lighthouse built
Coins for the Santomean escudo were issued for the colony
30 January Francisco Penteado became the 70th governor of Portuguese São Tomé and Príncipe
31 August - Luís Augusto Vieira Fernandes became the 71st governor of Portuguese São Tomé and Príncipe
November 1: An annular solar eclipse took place in the islands of the São Tome and Príncipe, the umbral path included a small part of Príncipe at the area of the southernmost part, a part of Neves Ferreira and the islets to the south the sky was almost dark
1931 - Andorinha Sport Club of the island of São Tomé established
1933 - 17 December: Ricardo Vaz Monteiro became the 72nd governor of Portuguese São Tomé and Príncipe
c. 1935 - São Tome Football Association (now as São Tomé and Príncipe (or Santomean) Football Federation) founded
1941 - 8 May: Amadeu Gomes de Figueiredo became the 73rd governor of Portuguese São Tomé and Príncipe
1945 - 5 April: Carlos de Sousa Gorgulho became the 74th governor of Portuguese São Tomé and Príncipe
1948 - July: Afonso Manuel Machade de Sousa became acting governor of Portuguese São Tomé and Príncipe for Carlos de Sousa Gorgulho
1950 - 8 October: Mário José Cabral Oliveira Castro became acting governor of Portuguese São Tomé and Príncipe for Carlos de Sousa Gorgulho
1951:
11 June: São Tomé and Príncipe became an overseas province
September 1: An annular solar eclipse took place in the islands of the São Tome and Príncipe, the umbral path included the southwesternmost of São Tomé Island and the sky was almost dark
1952:
28 June: Guilherme António Amaral Abranches Pinto became acting governor of São Tomé and Príncipe for Carlos de Sousa Gorgulho
21 September: Colégio-Liceu de São Tomé (São Tomé College-Lyceum) established, today it is known as Patrice Lumumba Preparatory School
1953:
18 April: Fernaodo Augusto Rodrigues became acting governor of São Tomé and Príncipe for Carlos de Sousa Gorgulho
19 May: Afonso Manuel Machado de Sousa became acting governor of São Tomé and Príncipe for Carlos de Sousa Gorgulho
July: Francisco António Pires Barata became the 75th governor of São Tomé and Príncipe
1954:
Renovation of the Colonial Office (now the Presidential Palace of São Tomé e Príncipe)
August: Luís de Câmara Leme Faria became acting governor of São Tomé and Príncipe for Francisco António Pires Barata
1955 - 15 June: José Machado became acting governor of São Tomé and Príncipe for Francisco António Pires Barata
1956:
Last modification of Our Lady of Grace Cathedral
5 December: Octávio Ferreira Gonçalves became acting governor of São Tomé and Príncipe for Francisco António Pires Barata
1957:
The Diocese of São Tomé became the Diocese of São Tomé and Príncipe
13 October: Manuel Marques de Abrantes Amaral became the 76th governor of São Tomé and Príncipe
1959 - Leoninos band established
1960 - Committee for the Liberation of São Tomé and Príncipe (now the Movement for the Liberation of São Tomé and Príncipe/Social Democratic Party), a nationalist group was established
1962 - 22 November: Douglas C-54D-10-DC 7502 of the Portuguese Air Force crashed shortly after take-off for Portela Airport, Lisbon, Portugal, killing 22 of the 37 people on board.
1963:
August: Alberto Monteiro de Sousa Campos became the last acting governor of São Tomé and Príncipe and was for Manuel Marques de Abrantes Amaral
30 October: António Jorge da Silva Sebastião became the 77th governor of São Tomé and Príncipe
1964
Santo António do Príncipe Lighthouse built
13 February: São Tomé Provincial (now Regional) Football Association founded
1968 - Príncipe Airport opened
1969 - 6 October: Escola Técnica Silva e Cunha, today, the National Lyceum opened
1972:
Post as governor of São Tomé and Príncipe briefly vacant
18 June: Inter Bom-Bom football (soccer) club established
1973:
João Cecilio Gonçalces became the 78th governor of São Tomé and Príncipe
March: The legislative elections took place
1974
April 25: the Carnation Revolution took place in Portugal, the Estado Novo regime collapsed, São Tomé and Príncipe became self-governed
29 July António Elísio Capelo Pires Veloso became the 79th and last governor of São Tomé and Príncipe
18 December - São Tomé and Príncipe became an autonomous province with António Elísio Capelo Pires Veloso as its only high commissioner
21 December: Leonel Mário d'Alva became the first Prime Minister of São Tomé and Príncipe and the only one before independence
1975 - July 12: Portuguese São Tomé and Príncipe dissolved and was the last Portuguese territory in Africa, São Tomé and Príncipe became an independent nation

See also
Portuguese Empire
Portuguese São Tomé and Príncipe
History of São Tomé and Príncipe

References

Bibliography
Izequiel Batista de Sousa, São Tomé et Principe de 1485 à 1755 : une société coloniale : du Blanc au Noir, L'Harmattan, Paris, 2008 )

History of São Tomé and Príncipe
History of the Portuguese Empire